Incunabula is the debut studio album by English electronic music duo Autechre, released by UK label Warp on 29 November 1993, and again by Wax Trax! on 25 January 1994 in the United States.

Incunabula became a surprise success, reaching the top of the UK Indie Chart. In 2012, UK magazine Fact named it the 11th best album of the 1990s. It was re-released on vinyl by Warp on 11 November 2016.

Production
Autechre member Rob Brown stated that Incunabula was "more of a compilation of old material" and that he believed follow-up album Amber was the "first album we put out on Warp."

Music critics David Stubbs and Ned Raggett noted that Incunabula would differ from Autechre's later releases. Raggett found that the album "doesn't totally display the full experimentation which would dominate their future albums and singles" while Stubbs stated that following both Incunabula and Amber, Autechre "took an increasingly remote turn, moving away from both the blissful pastures of the chillout zone and the wildfire, staplegun rhythms characteristic of the 'Intelligent Dance Music' brigade."

Raggett continued that the first track "Kalpol Introl" "sets the overall mood for the rest of the record" with the track's combination of minimal beats and bass with various keyboard textures and understated melodies. He concluded that Incunabula "follows the same general tone; tracks often experiment with ghostly keyboard backing and mostly clinical beats combined with odd, individual touches."

Release
Incunabula was released by Warp on 29 November 1993. It was released again by Wax Trax! on 25 January 1994 in the United States. Incunabula was re-released on vinyl by Warp on 11 November 2016.

Reception

In a contemporaneous review, the St. Louis Post-Dispatch stated that the repetition of most techno would be repellent to audiences but that this was not the case with the genre's "ambient strain", lumping Autechre with groups like The Orb and Ultramarine and artists such as Aphex Twin. The review found little relevance in citing individual tracks as highlights as they ebbed and flowed into each other, but stated that "the music is never boring and does inspire fits of introspection."

From retrospective reviews, David Stubbs of The Wire discussed both Incunabula and Amber stating the two were "terrific adventures in homebrewed Techno but not radically dissimilar in method from the work of their Warp contemporaries." Raggett (AllMusic) stated that "despite the relative sameness in the basic arrangements of tracks covering the better portion of the album -- a few song subtractions wouldn't have hurt the 75-minute length any -- Incunabula still stands out as a better effort than many other U.K. techno albums of the early '90s." The New Rolling Stone Album Guide gave the both Incunabula and Amber two and half stars out of five, describing them as "smart if unexciting ambient watercolors" that "give no indication of the innovations to follow". Pitchfork gave a positive review of the album, praising tracks such as "Bike" and "Basscadet", described as a "fan-favorite hit of sorts", while criticizing the album's "unwarranted" length.

Fact would place the album at 11th place on their list of best albums of the 1990s, stating that it was a "symphony of whirrs, cranks and rattling spokes; its formal ingenuity and sheer, brute intensity have sealed its status as a set text for the ages."

Track listing

Personnel
Credits adapted from Incunabula's record sleeve.
 Sean Booth – writer, producer
 Rob Brown – writer, producer
 Adrian Harrow – assistance
 Richard Brown – assistance
 Darrell Fitton – assistance
 Geoff Pesche – mastering
 The Designers Republic – design
 Daniel 72 – original images

See also
 1993 in music
 Music of the United Kingdom (1990s)

References

External links
 Incunabula at the official Warp website

1993 debut albums
Autechre albums
Warp (record label) albums
Wax Trax! Records albums
Albums with cover art by The Designers Republic